Sigglesthorne railway station was a railway station that served the villages of Great Hatfield, Little Hatfield and Sigglesthorne in the East Riding of Yorkshire, England. It was on the Hull and Hornsea Railway.

It opened on 28 March 1864, and was originally named "Hatfield". It was renamed (to avoid confusion with Hatfield on the East Coast Main Line), on 1 October 1874, and closed following the Beeching Report on 19 October 1964.

A section of the disused railway line is now a local nature reserve.

References

Other sources

External links
 Sigglesthorne station on navigable 1947 O. S. map

Disused railway stations in the East Riding of Yorkshire
Railway stations in Great Britain opened in 1864
Railway stations in Great Britain closed in 1964
Former North Eastern Railway (UK) stations
Beeching closures in England
Hull and Hornsea Railway
Local Nature Reserves in the East Riding of Yorkshire